Blutaparon is a genus of flowering plants in the family Amaranthaceae. They are coastal plants that occur in the tropics and subtropics in the Americas, Asia, and western Africa. Plants of this genus were long known as Philoxerus, a similar Australian genus.

These are annual or perennial herbs with stems that extend along the ground. They have fleshy, alternately arranged leaves and rounded or cylindrical flower heads at the tips of the stems.

There were four species:
Blutaparon portulacoides 
Blutaparon rigidum, extinct
Blutaparon vermiculare, Central America, south-eastern North America
Blutaparon wrightii

References

External links
GRIN Species Records of Blutaparon. Germplasm Resources Information Network (GRIN).

Amaranthaceae
Amaranthaceae genera
Taxa named by Constantine Samuel Rafinesque
Taxonomy articles created by Polbot